Henry Clavering may refer to:

Sir Henry Clavering, 10th Baronet of the Clavering baronets
Henry Clavering, fictional character in The Claverings

See also
Clavering (surname)